Luis Enrique Zayas Fernández (born 7 June 1997 in Santiago de Cuba) is a Cuban high jumper.

In July 2016, he realized his personal best of 2.27 m, a World Junior Lead performance, to win the title at 2016 World Junior Championships in Bydgoszcz.
He won the Panamerican Games title with a new personal best of 2.30 m in 2019. He competed at the 2020 Summer Olympics.

References

External links
IAAF Athlete’s profile.

Cuban male high jumpers
Living people
Athletes (track and field) at the 2019 Pan American Games
Pan American Games gold medalists for Cuba
Pan American Games medalists in athletics (track and field)
1997 births
Pan American Games gold medalists in athletics (track and field)
Medalists at the 2019 Pan American Games
Athletes (track and field) at the 2020 Summer Olympics
Olympic athletes of Cuba
21st-century Cuban people